Nicole Castrale (pronounced "cass-TRAHL-ee", née Dalkas, born March 24, 1979) is an American professional golfer on the LPGA Tour.

Castrale was born in Glendale, California, and started playing golf at the age of 10. She graduated from Palm Desert High School in 1997 and played college golf for the USC Trojans in Los Angeles and earned her bachelor's degree in 2001.

Professional career
Castrale has won once on the LPGA Tour, the 2007 Ginn Tribute Hosted by Annika. She also played on the Futures Tour, winning twice in consecutive weeks in 2005.

Castrale played on the U.S. Solheim Cup teams in 2007 and 2009. She made the clinching putt for the U.S. to defeat Europe in the 2007 matches in Halmstad, Sweden. She also played on the International team in the 2007 and 2008 Lexus Cups.

Castrale did not compete past June in both 2010 and 2011. She underwent surgery on her left shoulder in early July 2010 and rehabilitated the rest of the season. Castrale played a limited schedule in 2011 due to pregnancy and her last competitive round was on June 10. She gave birth to the couple's first child, a daughter, in November and returned to the LPGA Tour in March 2012.

Personal life
Castrale married Craig Castrale on January 8, 2005, divorced in 2015.

Professional wins (3)

LPGA Tour (1)

LPGA Tour playoff record (1–0)

Futures Tour (2)

Results in LPGA majors
Results not in chronological order before 2014.

^ The Evian Championship was added as a major in 2013.

CUT = missed the half-way cut
T = tied

Summary

Most consecutive cuts made – 7 (2006 LPGA – 2007 British Open)
Longest streak of top-10s – 2 (2008 LPGA – 2008 U.S. Open)

Team appearances
Professional
Solheim Cup (representing the United States): 2007 (winners), 2009 (winners)
Lexus Cup (representing International team): 2007, 2008 (winners)

Solheim Cup record

References

External links

American female golfers
USC Trojans women's golfers
LPGA Tour golfers
Solheim Cup competitors for the United States
Golfers from California
Sportspeople from Glendale, California
People from Palm Desert, California
1979 births
Living people